Aspergillus sclerotiorum is a species of fungus in the genus Aspergillus. It is from the Circumdati section. The species was first described in 1933. A. sclerotiorum has been reported to produce penicillic acid, xanthomegnin, viomellein, and vioxanthin.

In 2016, the genome of A. sclerotiorum was sequenced as a part of the Aspergillus whole-genome sequencing project - a project dedicated to performing whole-genome sequencing of all members of the genus Aspergillus. The genome assembly size was 37.97 Mbp.

Growth and morphology
Aspergillus sclerotiorum has been cultivated on both Czapek yeast extract agar (CYA) plates and Malt Extract Agar Oxoid® (MEAOX) plates. The growth morphology of the colonies can be seen in the pictures below.

Heavy Metal Tolerance
In a study published in Dec 2020, cadmium, chromium, and lead tolerant microbes have been isolated from contaminated mining soil and characterized. Six soil samples were collected from Nanjing mine (32°09′19.29″ N 118°56′57.04″ E). Soil samples were taken from the depth of 0~30 cm and processed within 8 h. After the collection of soil samples, these were kept on dry ice and further used to isolate fungi. Aspergillus Sclerotiorum was one of 5 identified strains that exhibited tolerance to all 3 of these heavy metals.

Molecular characterization of isolated fungi was performed and amplified sequences were deposited in the GenBank NCBI database. Metal tolerance of the various strains has been determined by measuring the minimum inhibitory concentrations (MICs) and the tolerance indexes of all the tested strains against Cd, Cr, and Pb. Bioaccumulation capacities of Trichoderma harzianum and Komagataella phaffi have also been assessed. These findings helped us find a novel strain of Komagataella phaffi and suggested it to be the potential mycoremediation microbe to alleviate the contamination of Cd, Cr, and Pb. Future studies of this fungal strain can help us to understand its resistance mechanism against other heavy metals, too.

References 

sclerotiorum
Fungi described in 1933